Ready set go may refer to:

Software
Ready, Set, Go! (software), a computer application

Music
Ready Set Go! (band), an American pop band of siblings, now known as Echosmith

Albums
Ready, Set, Go with Patti Page, by Patti Page 
Ready Set Go! (album), an album by Roscoe Dash
Ready Ready Set Go, an album by Prozzäk

Songs
Ready, Set, Go! (Tokio Hotel song), a song by Tokio Hotel, English version of "Übers Ende der Welt"
"Ready Set Go", by LC9
"Ready Set Go", Royal Tailor featuring Capital Kings Royal Tailor
"Ready Set Go", Killer Mike featuring T.I. T.I. videography
"Ready Set Go", Tears from Heaven

See also
"Ready, Set, Don't Go"
Ready Steady Go!

English phrases